is a Japanese actor.　He is known for his parts in jidaigeki television dramas especially Kakusan in Mito Kōmon series,　but is known as part of the cast of Samurai Sentai Shinkenger as Hikoma Kusakabe.

Filmography

Film
Bohachi Bushido: Code of the Forgotten Eight (1973)
Bohachi Bushido Saburai (1974) - Kyushi Issho (Main role)
Battles Without Honor and Humanity (1973)
Battles Without Honor and Humanity: Final Episode (1974)
The Homeless (1974)
Hokuriku Proxy War (1977)
Nichiren (1979)
The Magic Hour (2008)
Samurai Sentai Shinkenger The Movie: The Fateful War - Hikoma Kusakabe (2009)
Samurai Sentai Shinkenger vs. Go-onger: GinmakuBang!! - Hikoma Kusakabe (2010)
Tensou Sentai Goseiger vs. Shinkenger: Epic on Ginmaku - Hikoma Kusakabe (2011)
Strawberry Night (2013)
The Mole Song: Undercover Agent Reiji (2013)
The Blood of Wolves - Kenji Odani (2018)

Television
Shin Heike Monogatari (1972) - Hachirō Tametomo
Kunitori Monogatari - Hosokawa Fujitaka (1973)
Unmeitōge - Yagyū Jūbei Mitsuyoshi (1974)
Kusa Moeru - Wada Yoshimori (1979)
Hissatsu Shigotonin (1979-1981) - Samon
Tokugawa Ieyasu (1983) - Katō Kiyomasa
Mito Kōmon - Kakusan (1983-2000)
Samurai Sentai Shinkenger - Hikoma Kusakabe (2009–10)
Kamen Rider Decade - Hikoma Kusakabe (Guest star) (2009)
Tenchijin - Hōjō Ujimasa (2009)
Yae's Sakura - Tokugawa Nariaki (2013)
Gunshi Kanbei - Hōjō Ujimasa (2014)
Nobunaga Moyu - Shibata Katsuie (2016)
Kirin ga Kuru - Taigen Sessai (2020)

References

External links
 
 

1946 births
Japanese male film actors
Living people
Yakumo, Hokkaido